Henry John Stewart (2 March 1873 – 2 May 1960) was a Welsh Anglican priest.

Stewart was born in Lampeter and educated at St David's College there. He was ordained deacon in 1896, and priest in 1897. After curacies in Llandysul and Llansamlet he held incumbencies at Llangorwen, Cockett, Sketty and Builth. He was Archdeacon of Brecon from 1941 to 1947.

References

1873 births
1960 deaths
Archdeacons of Brecon
People from Lampeter
19th-century Welsh Anglican priests
20th-century Welsh Anglican priests
Alumni of the University of Wales, Lampeter
People from Ceredigion